The AN/APQ-120 was an aircraft fire control radar (FCR) manufactured by Westinghouse for the McDonnell Douglas F-4E Phantom II.  AN/APQ-120 has a long line of lineage, with its origin traced all the way back to Aero-13 FCR developed by the same company in the early 1950s.  A total of half a dozen FCRs were tested and evaluated on the first 18 F-4s built, but they were soon replaced by later radars produced in great numbers, including AN/APQ-120.

Aero 13

The Aero 13 FCR designed for Douglas F4D Skyray is the origin of AN/APQ-120, and it established the configuration of the airborne FCR not only for the radar families of AN/APQ-120, but also a standard for all other airborne radars to follow: Aero 13 FCR was designed as an integrated cylindrical module that could be plugged into the nose of an aircraft, instead of a set of semi-independent black boxes.

Aero 1A
Aero 13 did not have any capability for semi-active radar homing (SARH) air-to-air missile (AAM)s. 1A FCR was developed to add this capability by incorporating a continuous wave illuminator for SARH AAMs.  This configuration of Aero 1A remained unchanged for later radars for F-4s all the way until AN/APQ-50.

AN/APQ-35

The next radar to be installed on F-4 prototypes and pre-production series was AN/APQ-35, which was actually consisted of two radars: the AN/APS-21 search radar that could locate fighter-size targets at a range of 32 kilometers (20 miles), and the AN/APS-26 targeting radar, with a range of 3.2 kilometers (2 miles).

AN/APQ-36
AN/APQ-36 is the improvement over earlier AN/APQ-35, and when AN/APQ-36 entered service on Douglas F3D Skyknight and Vought F7U Cutlass, it was the largest airborne FCR of its time. The more powerful AN/APQ-36 with large size did not have any problem being installed on F-4 prototypes, so that more powerful FCR of larger size would be developed.

AN/APQ-41
The AN/APQ-41 was an improvement over the AN/APQ-36, and was designed to provide air intercept, search, to automatically track a selected target, and to supply lead angle and range information. Facilities were also provided for air-to-surface search, for beacon interrogation and response display, and for response display when used in connection with identification friend or foe (IFF). Specifications:
Search or Gun-Aim Range: 24 nm max, 200 yd min
Ground Mapping Range: 100 nm
Beacon Range: 200 nm
Reliable Gun-Aim Prediction: 2,000 yd max
Tracking Accuracy: 25 yd within the ranges of 200 and 2,000 yd
Future Range Accuracy: 25 yd
Azimuth (Search): 106.5 deg
Elevation (Search): 13 deg (within 30 deg of aircraft center line)
Azimuth (Track): 116.5 deg
Elevation (Track): 116.5 deg
Accuracy (Search and Track): 4% all indications
Type of Presentation:
B-scope (Search)-Target azimuth and range, range strobe, range markers, beacon and IFF responses
C-scope (Search)-Target strobe, targets, straddled by range strobe, artificial horizon line, scan pattern
C-scope (Track)-Target dot, range rate circle and dot, artificial horizon line
Fixed Range Marker: 25-mi markers on 100 and 200-mi scales
Radar Frequency (Search and Track): 9375 30 mc
Beacon Frequency: Transmitting, 9375 30 mc; receiving, 9310 1 mc
Operating Temperature:-55 to +55 deg C
Altitude Limit: 52,000 ft

AN/APQ-46
AN/APQ-46 is the last radar tested and evaluated on F-4 prototypes and pre-production series.  F-4 equipped with this radar was specifically modified to meet US Navy Ferret electronic countermeasure aircraft requirement, which eventually did not materialize.

AN/APQ-50

AN/APQ-50 is the radar installed on low-rate initial production batch of F-4s, but as with earlier radars, it was not used in great numbers in comparison to later radars of the same family.  The parabolic antenna is 24 inches in diameter, and in addition to providing all weather capability, AN/APQ-50 FCR also provides information on automatic firing of rockets.

AN/APQ-72
AN/APQ-72 FCR is a development of AN/APQ-50, with the diameter of the antenna increased by a third to 32 inches from the original 24 inches of AN/APQ-50.  AN/APA-128 CW illuminator is integrated with the radar to give it a capability for radar guided AAMs.  AN/APQ-72 is the first radar installed on F-4s to be built in great numbers, starting with the 19th F-4 produced.

AN/APG-59
AN/APG-59 FCR is a modified AN/APQ-72 designed for the British.  The main difference between AN/APG-59 and its predecessor is that the radar dish could be swung sideways in order to reduce the length of the aircraft to 54 feet so that it could fit on the small deck lifts of British carriers. Used in the AN/AWG-10.

AN/APQ-100
AN/APQ-100 is the replacement for the AN/APQ-72, and it featured a redesigned radar scope in the rear cockpit that offered a plan position indicator (PPI) mapping display option, and adjustable range strobe for bombing. For air-to-ground missions, the radar interfaced with the inertial platform on F-4s.

AN/APG-60
Modified AN/APQ-100 for the British to replace the AN/APG-59.  As with AN/APG-59, AN/APG-60 also had a radar dish which could be swung sideways in order to reduce the length of the aircraft to 54 feet so that it could fit on the small deck lifts of British carriers. AN/APG-60 was later upgraded with Doppler capability during its upgrades, and integrated in the AN/AWG-11.

AN/APQ-109
AN/APQ-109 is an improvement of the earlier AN/APQ-100 with an improved cockpit display able to handle TV imagery from weapons such as AGM-62 Walleye.  Other significant additions included air-to-ground ranging, ground beacon identification and display capabilities. AN/APQ-109 was an improved, more reliable "hybrid" version of the AN/APQ-100 with solid-state components in the low-voltage sections.

AN/APG-61
Modified AN/APQ-109 for the British to replace AN/APG-60.  As with AN/APG-59/60, AN/APG-61 also had a radar dish which could be swung sideways in order to reduce the length of the aircraft to 54 feet so that it could fit on the small deck lifts of British carriers. Used in the AN/AWG-12.

AN/APQ-117
AN/APQ-117 terrain following and attack radar, developed from earlier AN/APQ-109, with terrain following capability added.

AN/APQ-120
A fully solid-state radar developed from AN/APQ-117, the AN/APQ-120 radar was much more compact than its predecessors, allowing it to fit into the nose along with the cannon, and the radar was later integrated into AN/AWG-14.

AN/AWG-10

AN/AWG stands for (A) Piloted Aircraft (W) Armament (G) Fire Control. AN/APG-59 was the first FCR integrated into AN/AWG-10, which developed into two more versions, A and B. The original AN/AWG-10 can detect an aerial target with 5 square meters radar cross section more than 100 kilometers away.

AN/AWG-10A is a development of the original AN/AWG-10, with great improvement in reliability and maintainability by replacing the original transmitter in AN/AWG-10 with a solid state unit whose only tube was a klystron power amplifier.  Adding a digital computer allowed much more effective missile launch equations. AN/AWG-10A also incorporated a new servoed optical sight. There were also additions of new modes such as continuously displayed impact point mode, freeze displayed impact mode, and computer released visual mode.  AN/AWG-10B was further digitized version of AN/AWG-10/10A but retained many analog circuits. A key AVC (avionics change) was the replacement of the unreliable Doppler Spectrum Analyzer (DSA) with a reliable Digital Spectrum Processor (DSP) which also increased accuracy when operating in doppler mode.

AN/AWG-11
AN/AWG-11 was a British AN/AWG-10 license-built by Ferranti. The radar used was AN/APG-60, and AN/AWG-11 is a slightly modified AN/AWG-10 in that it's compatible with AGM-12 Bullpup and WE.177, so that British F-4s can perform nuclear strike missions if required.

AN/AWG-12
AN/AWG-12 was an improved AN/AWG-11 built by Ferranti with AN/APG-61 FCR. The main difference between AN/AWG-11 and AN/AWG-12 is that the latter has a better ground mapping mode, and it also can control a belly mounted SUU-23/A Vulcan. AN/AWG-12 finally retired in 1992 when the last F-4s in British service retired, and during its service life, it was upgraded with improvements of the AN/AWG-10A/B.

AN/AWG-14
AN/AWG-14 is the final member of the lineage of this radar family, and it is a fully digitized upgrade of the AWG series incorporating AN/APQ-120.  The open architecture and modular design enable AWG-14 to accommodate different radars, such as AN/APG-65, AN/APG-66, AN/APG-76, Elta EL/M-2011/2021 and EL/M-2032.

See also
List of radars
Joint Electronics Type Designation System

References

External links

Aircraft radars
Military radars of the United States